Cheltenham is a town in Gloucestershire, England.

Cheltenham may also refer to:

Places

Australia
 Cheltenham, New South Wales
 Cheltenham, Queensland, a locality in the North Burnett Region, Queensland, Australia
 Cheltenham, South Australia
 Electoral district of Cheltenham, a state electoral district in South Australia based around the suburb
 Cheltenham Park Racecourse, a racing track located within the suburb (closed in 2010)
 Cheltenham, Victoria

United States
 Cheltenham, Maryland
 Cheltenham, St. Louis, Missouri, a neighborhood
 Cheltenham Township, Montgomery County, Pennsylvania
 Cheltenham, Pennsylvania, a census-designated place within Cheltenham Township

Elsewhere
 Cheltenham, Ontario, Canada
 Cheltenham, Auckland, a suburb of Auckland
 Cheltenham, Manawatu, a locality in New Zealand

Surname 

 Richard Cheltenham (born 1941), Barbadian politician

Other uses
 Cheltenham Festival, a meeting in the National Hunt racing calendar in the UK
 Cheltenham (typeface), an American typeface
 Cheltenham Town F.C., the town's football team
 Cheltenham (UK Parliament constituency)
 SS Cheltenham, several steamships with this name